Westfields Sports High School (abbreviated as WSHS) is a government-funded co-educational comprehensive and specialist secondary day school, with speciality in sports, located in Fairfield West, a western suburb of Sydney, New South Wales, Australia.

Established in 1963, the school caters for approximately 1,660 students in 2018, from Year 7 to Year 12, of whom three percent identified as Indigenous Australians and 66 percent were from a language background other than English. The school is operated by the NSW Department of Education; the principal is Andrew Rogers.

Westfields Sports High School is a member of the NSW Sports High Schools Association.

History

The school was established in 1963 and opened by Edward Gough Whitlam, later Australian Prime Minister. The school's first Principal was J. P. Quinlan and its first year enrolment had 300 students. The school originally had four sporting houses:  Prospect (team colours black and gold); Kanangra (red); Werriwa (blue) and Lansdowne (green).

In 1964 the new student intake was even larger than the previous year, with close to a thousand new students enrolled. Classes were listed alphabetically from A down to J to include them all.  That year also saw a massive fire at the school that affected mainly the science block and the technical arts block, rendering many of the classrooms unusable. Classrooms were temporarily offered at the local primary school, Fairfield West Public School on Hamilton Road, until the burnt out classrooms could be restored.  Each day for close to a year, around 100 or so new Year 7 students would attend assembly at Westfields, then march up the hill to classrooms at Fairfield West PS. The cause of the fire was never stated, but it was strongly suspected that the expulsion of several students earlier in the year had led to a grudge arson attack, since the words "N R gang" had been painted in large letters across the girls' and boys' toilet blocks.

From the 1960s to the 1980s the school achieved moderate success in sports and was on the rise during the late 1980s. The then principal, Philip Tucker, had wanted to establish Westfields as a school that could provide any sports person who attended, a pathway to the Australian Institute of Sport, and extend their possibilities beyond high school level sporting competition. The school was eventually officially declared a sports school on 24 April 1991.

Notable teachers who taught at the school in the early years of their careers include the artist Mary Shackman and the international concert pianist Michael Leslie.

Since 1997, there has been an annual student and teacher exchange scheme with Kasukabe High School, from Kasukabe, Saitama, Japan.

In 2008, the International Olympic Committee recognized Westfields Sports for their involvement in producing many Australian Olympians with a special Sport and Youth Trophy.

Enrolment policy 
The school has a partially selective approach to enrolment, with students needing to either live within the relatively small catchment area of the school, or demonstrate their ability in sport. The school is very well regarded for having produced sporting talent in a number of different areas of sporting endeavour, and has received a range of grants to support its work with sporting talent.

Talented sports program 
Sports offered at Westfields Sports High School include athletics, Australian rules football, baseball, basketball, boxing, cricket, dance, equestrian, golf, gymnastics, hockey, netball, rowing, rugby league, rugby union, soccer, softball, swimming, table tennis, tennis, volleyball, and wrestling.

Notable alumni

 Mustafa Aminisoccer player
 Chris Armitrugby league player
 Terry Antonissoccer player
 Michael Beauchampsoccer player
 Leon Bottrugby league player
 Alex Brosquesoccer player
 Michael Buettnerrugby league player
 Jacob Burnssoccer player
 Anthony Cáceressoccer player
 Jason Cadeebasketball player
 David Carneysoccer player
 Ellie Carpentersoccer player
 Connor Chapmansoccer player
 Michael Clarkecricket player
 Jason Culinasoccer player
 Hannah Darlington- Cricketer
 Miloš Degeneksoccer player
 Israel Folaurugby union, rugby league, and Australian rules football player
 Liam Fultonrugby league player
 Bryce Gibbsrugby league player
 Kelly Golebiowskisoccer player
 Blake Greenrugby league player
 Michael Greenfieldrugby league player
 Eric Grothe Jr.rugby league player
 Dene Halataurugby league player
 Amy Harrisonsoccer player
 Jarryd Haynerugby league player
 Josh Hildersoccer player
 Trent Hodkinsonrugby league player
 Justin Hororugby league player
 Bernie Ibini-Iseisoccer player
 Princess Ibini-Iseisoccer player
 Jamal Idrisrugby league player
 Krisnan Inurugby league player
Luke Ivanovicsoccer player
 Scott Jamiesonsoccer player
 Matthew Jurmansoccer player
 Billie Kayprofessional wrestler
 Kris Keatingrugby league player
 Matt Keatingrugby league player
 Alanna Kennedysoccer player
 Harry Kewellsoccer player
 Usman Khawajacricket player
 David Klemmerrugby league player
 Tim Lafairugby league player
 Fabrice Lapierreathlete
 Issac Lukerugby league player
 Alfie Mafirugby union player
 Sitiveni Mafirugby union player
 Kristiana Manu'a-netball player
 Feleti Mateorugby league player
 Karl McNicholrugby league player
 Mark Minichiellorugby league player
 Aaron Mooysoccer player
Moudi Najjarsoccer player
Ramy Najjarinesoccer player
 Heka Nanairugby league player
 Luke O'Donnellrugby league player
 Helen Petinossoccer player
 Corey Paynerugby league player
 Kim Ravaillionnetball player
 Pat Richardsrugby league player
 Peyton Royceprofessional wrestler
 Mathew Ryansoccer player
Jason Saabrugby league player 
 Dani Samuelsathlete
Sam Silvera – soccer player
Jeremy Su'arugby union player
 John Thornellathlete
 Maria Tranactress and filmmaker
 Danny Vukovicsoccer player
 Amorette Wildnetball player
 Tony Williamsrugby league player
Daniel Wilmeringsoccer player

See also 

 List of government schools in New South Wales
 Selective school (New South Wales)
 Education in Australia

References

Educational institutions established in 1963
Public high schools in New South Wales
1963 establishments in Australia
South Western Sydney
Sports schools in Australia